The following list is a discography of production by No I.D., an American hip hop record producer from Chicago, Illinois. It includes a list of songs produced, co-produced and remixed by year, artist, album and title.

Singles produced

1992

Common Sense - Breaker 1/9 (VLS) 
 A2. "Breaker 1/9 (Slope Remix)"

Common Sense - Can I Borrow a Dollar? 
(All songs produced with The Twilite Tone.)
 01. "A Penny for My Thoughts"
 02. "Charms Alarm"
 03. "Take It EZ" 
 05. "Breaker 1/9"
 06. "Two Scoops of Raisins"
 07. "No Defense"
 08. "Blows to the Temple"
 09. "Just in the Nick of Rhyme" 
 10. "Tricks Up My Sleeve"
 11. "Puppy Chow"
 12. "Soul by the Pound"
 13. "Pitchin' Pennies"

1993

Common Sense - Soul by the Pound (VLS) 
 A1. "Soul by the Pound (Thump Remix)"

1994

Common Sense - Resurrection 
 01. "Resurrection"
 02. "I Used to Love H.E.R."
 03. "Watermelon" 
 04. "Book of Life" 
 05. "In My Own World (Check the Method)" (featuring No I.D.)
 07. "Nuthin' to Do"
 08. "Communism" 
 09. "WMOE"
 10. "Thisisme"
 11. "Orange Pineapple Juice" 
 13. "Maintaining" 
 15. "Pop's Rap"

1995

Common Sense - Resurrection (VLS) 
 A1. "Resurrection '95 (Clean)"

Scha Dara Parr - The Cycle Hits-Remix Best Collection 
 09. "Tsuiteru Otoko '94 Haru (No I.D. Remix)"

1996

Al' Tariq - God Connections 
 07. "No Question" (featuring Black Attack, Problemz & The Rawcotiks)
 13. "Everybody's Talking"

Grav - Down to Earth 
 11. "Sex"

Mind Space - Life Is Foul (VLS) 
 A3. "Who Got the Funk?"

Various artists - America Is Dying Slowly 
 10. "(Lately) I've Been Thinking" (performed by Common & Sean Lett)

1997

Common - One Day It'll All Make Sense 
 01. "Introspective"
 02. "Invocation"
 04. "Retrospect for Life" (featuring Lauryn Hill) (produced with James Poyser)
 05. "Gettin' Down at the Ampitheather" (featuring De La Soul)
 06. "Food for Funk"
 07. "G.O.D. (Gaining One's Definition)" (featuring Cee-Lo Green) (produced with Spike Rebel)
 09. "Hungry"
 11. "Stolen Moments, Pt. I" 
 12. "Stolen Moments, Pt. II" (featuring Black Thought)
 13. "Stolen Moments, Pt. III" (featuring Q-Tip) 
 15. "Making a Name for Ourselves" (featuring Canibus)

Saukrates - Brick House 
 B2. "Play Dis (Remix)" (featuring Common)

Various artists - Soul in the Hole soundtrack 
 09. "High Expectations" (performed by Common)

1998

All Natural - No Additives, No Preservatives 
 12. "Thinkin' Cap"

Mondo Grosso - The Man from the Sakura Hills 
 C1. "Things Keep Changin' (No I.D.'s Use Your Common Sense Mix)"

1999

Bigg Nastee - My Life, Dreams & Feelings 
 02. "Done Been One"
 15. "What That Girl" (featuring Shawnna)

Infamous Syndicate - Changing the Game 
 02. "Here I Go"
 04. "Hold It Down"
 10. "It's Alright"

The Madd Rapper - Tell 'Em Why U Madd 
 17. "Not the One" (produced with Kanye West)

Various artists - World Record Holders 
 24. "Let My Niggas In" (performed by Go Getters) (produced with Kanye West)

2001

Beanie Sigel - The Reason 
 09. "Man's World"

Presence - Let It Begin 
 14. "One of a Kind" (produced with Dug Infinite)

2002

Toni Braxton - More Than a Woman 
 01. "Let Me Show You The Way (Out)"

Jaheim - Still Ghetto 
 03. "Diamond in da Rough"

Jay-Z - The Blueprint²: The Gift & The Curse 
 07. "All Around The World" (featuring LaToiya Williams)

Midwikid - Something Wikid This Way Comes... 
 04. "Like We Sposed Ta" (featuring Jaheim)

4IZE - The Cake Song (VLS) 
 A1. "The Cake Song (Radio Edit)"
 A4. "Oh My God" (bonus track)
 B1. "Said So (Radio Edit)"

2003

DMX - Grand Champ 
 15. "We Go Hard" (featuring Cam'ron)

G-Unit - Beg for Mercy 
 11. "Smile" (performed by Lloyd Banks)

Ice Grillz - Fire N Ice 
 12. "Get Weary"

K. Fox - Life (L.A. to Chicago) (VLS) 
 A1. "Life (L.A. to Chicago) (Main Mix)"
 B1. "Closer (Main Mix)"

2004

Ghostface Killah - The Pretty Toney Album 
 05. "Metal Lungies" (featuring Sheek Louch & Styles P)
 18. "Love" (featuring Musiq & K. Fox)

Method Man - Tical 0: The Prequel 
 08. "Tease" (featuring Chinky)

Chico & Coolwadda - Parallel 
 03. "E'rthang" (featuring Young Roscoe)
 05. "Wild N D' West II" (featuring 40 Bronzon, Defari & Neb Luv)
 06. "Psssh" (featuring Cy Bravo & Joe Wells)

Rah Digga - Everything Is a Story (unreleased) 
 01. "Intro" (featuring Ghostface Killah)

2005

Bow Wow - Wanted 
 03. "Let Me Hold You" (featuring Omarion) (co-produced by Jermaine Dupri)

Crisis - Beautiful Mind 
 12. "I Can't Stand"

Do or Die - D.O.D. 
 03. "Be Alright" (featuring Ric Jilla and Johnny P.)

J.U.I.C.E. - All Bets Off 
 08. "Weekend Girl" (featuring Profound)

Jamie Foxx - Unpredictable 
 08. "Three Letter Word"

Majic Massey - Ooh Wee (VLS) 
 A1. "Ooh Wee (Clean)"
 B1. "I Got That (Clean)" (featuring Kaye Fox)

Ric Jilla - On the What (VLS) 
 A1. "On the What (Radio Version)"

2006

Bossman - You're Wrong (VLS) 
 A1. "You're Wrong (Edited Version)"

Bow Wow - The Price of Fame 
 03. "4 Corners" (featuring Lil Wayne, Lil Scrappy, Pimp C, Short Dawg) (co-produced by Jermaine Dupri & LRoc)
 04. "Outta My System" (featuring T-Pain) (co-produced by Jermaine Dupri & LRoc)

Daz Dillinger - So So Gangsta 
 01. "Thang on My Hip"

Janet Jackson - 20 Y.O. 
 05. "Do It To Me"  (produced by Jermaine Dupri, No I.D. and Jimmy Jam & Terry Lewis)

Joy Denalane - Born & Raised 
 01. "Change" (featuring Lupe Fiasco)
 11. "Born & Raised"

Naledge - Will Rap for Food 
 13. "Broke Diaries"

Rampage - Demagraffix 
 14. "The Demagraffix Interlude"

Rhymefest - Blue Collar 
 04. "Fever"
 06. "Get Down"
 08. "Chicago-Rillas (featuring Mikkey) (produced with Miykal Snoddy)
 12. "Sister" (featuring Mike Payne) (co-produced by Rhymefest)

Various artists - CTA Radio - Chi City Hip Hop 
 24. "Driving By" (performed by The Usual Suspects)

2007

Ali & Gipp - Kinfolk 
 05. "Almost Made Ya" (featuring LeToya Luckett) (produced by Jermaine Dupri, co-produced by No I.D. and L-Roc)

iCON the Mic King - Rent Money Music II: C-Notes For The Car Note 
 10. "Conjugation"

Jay-Z - American Gangster 
 12. "Success" (featuring Nas) (co-produced by Jermaine Dupri)
 13. "Fallin'" (featuring Bilal) (produced by Jermaine Dupri, co-produced by No I.D.)

2008

Plies - Da REAList 
 16. "Put It on Ya"

Kanye West - 808s & Heartbreak 
 03. "Heartless" (produced with Kanye West)
 10. "See You in My Nightmares" (featuring Lil Wayne) (produced with Kanye West)
 11. "Coldest Winter" (produced with Kanye West & Jeff Bhasker)

Killer Mike - I Pledge Allegiance to the Grind II 
 07. "God in the Building" (produced by The Cancer & Kidz with Machine Gunz, co-produced by No I.D.)

Janet Jackson - Discipline 
 17. "The 1"  (produced by Jermaine Dupri co-produced by Manuel Seal and No I.D.)

Various artists - Chicago Underworld Vol. 3 
 11. "Rebel to America" (performed by Mikkey Halsted)

2009

Jim Jones - Pray IV Reign 
 01. "Intro" (co-produced by Chink Santana)

Jay-Z - The Blueprint 3 
 01. "What We Talkin' About" (produced with Kanye West)
 02. "Thank You" (produced with Kanye West)
 03. "D.O.A. (Death of Auto-Tune)" 
 04. "Run This Town" (featuring Kanye West & Rihanna) (produced with Kanye West) 
 09. "A Star Is Born" (featuring J. Cole) (produced with Kanye West)

Michael Jackson - The Remix Suite 
 17. "Who's Lovin' You (No ID Remix)"

Twista - Category F5 
 16. "Alright" (featuring Kanye West) (produced with Kanye West)

Fabolous - Loso's Way 
 03. "Makin' Love" (featuring Ne-Yo) (co-produced by Jermaine Dupri)

2010

Killer Mike - PL3DGE 
 18. "Ready, Set, Go" (Killer Mike featuring T.I.)

Drake - Thank Me Later 
 06. "Show Me A Good Time"  (Produced with Kanye West & Jeff Bhasker)
 13. "Find Your Love" (Produced with Kanye West & Jeff Bhasker)
 00. "You Know,You Know" (Produced With Kanye West & Prolyfic)

Rick Ross - Teflon Don 
 03. "Tears of Joy" (featuring Cee Lo Green)

Big Sean - Finally Famous v.3 Mixtape 
 04. "Money & Sex" (featuring Bun B)

Jazmine Sullivan - Love Me Back 
 10. "Famous" (produced with Prolyfic)

Kid Cudi - Man on the Moon II: The Legend of Mr. Rager 
 01. "Scott Mescudi vs. the World" (featuring Cee Lo Green) (produced with Emile & The Smeezingtons)
 02. "REVOFEV" (produced with Plain Pat)
 10. "The Mood" (produced with Emile)
 12. "Mr. Rager" (produced with Emile & Jeff Bhasker)
 16. "GHOST!" (produced with Emile)

RPA & The United Nations of Sound - United Nations of Sound 
 Production on entire album

Kanye West - My Beautiful Dark Twisted Fantasy 
 01. "Dark Fantasy" (produced with RZA, Kanye West, Jeff Bhasker & Mike Dean)
 02. "Gorgeous" (featuring Kid Cudi & Raekwon) (produced with Kanye West, Mike Dean & Ken Lewis)
 07. "So Appalled" (featuring Jay-Z, Cyhi Da Prynce, RZA & Pusha T) (produced with Kanye West, Mike Dean & Jeff Bhasker)
 14. "See Me Now" (featuring Big Sean, Charlie Wilson, Beyoncé) (produced with Kanye West & Lex Luger)

2011

Killer Mike - PL3DGE 
 04. "Ready Set Go" (featuring T.I.)
 15. "Ready Set Go (Remix)" (featuring T.I. & Big Boi)

Cocaine 80s - The Pursuit
 01. "Nameless"
 02. "Summer Madness"
 03. "To Tell You the Truth"
 04. "Get You Some"
 05. "Not No More"
 06. "Nothing"
 07. "Anywhere but Here"
 08. "Like a Fool (Birdsong)"

Big Sean - Finally Famous: The Album 
 02. "I Do It" (produced with The Legendary Traxster)
 03. "My Last" (featuring Chris Brown)
 04. "Don't Tell Me You Love Me"
 05. "Wait for Me" (featuring Lupe Fiasco) (produced with Exile)
 09. "Memories (Part II)"
 11. "Live This Life" (featuring The-Dream)
 12. "So Much More" 
 13. "What Goes Around" (Bonus Track)
 14. "Celebrity" (co-produced with Filthy Rockwell) (Bonus Track)

Jay-Z & Kanye West - Watch the Throne 
 15. "Primetime" (Bonus Track)

Ed Sheeran - + 
 11. "Kiss Me"

J. Cole - Cole World: The Sideline Story 
 12. "Never Told"

Cocaine 80s - Ghost Lady
 01. "The Fall"
 02. "Six Feet Over"
 03. "Missing Me from Heaven"
 04. "Not No More (Part II)"
 05. "Tomorrow"
 06. "Loved to Death"
 07. "The Legend of the Heart"

Rihanna - Talk That Talk 
 07. "We All Want Love"

Common - The Dreamer/The Believer 
 01. "The Dreamer" (featuring Maya Angelou)
 02. "Ghetto Dreams" (featuring Nas)
 03. "Blue Sky"
 04. "Sweet"
 05. "Gold"
 06. "Lovin' I Lost"
 07. "Raw (How You Like It)" 
 08. "Cloth"
 09. "Celebrate"
 10. "Windows"
 11. "The Believer" (featuring John Legend)
 12. "Pops Belief"

2012

The World Famous Tony Williams - King or the Fool 
 12. "Mr. Safety" (featuring Raheem DeVaughn and Stokley Williams)

Melanie Fiona - The MF Life 
 01. "This Time" (featuring J. Cole)
 03. "Break Down These Walls"
 12. "L.O.V.E." (featuring John Legend)

Cocaine 80s - Express OG
 01. "Queen to Be"
 02. "Take My Keys"
 03. "This Can't Be a Crime"
 04. "Chain Glow"
 05. "Unchain Me / Love 3x"
 06. "Motivation"

Nas - Life Is Good 
 02. "Loco-Motive" (featuring Large Professor)
 04. "Accident Murderers" (featuring Rick Ross)
 05. "Daughters"
 10. "Back When"
 12. "Stay"
 18. "Where's the Love" (featuring Cocaine 80s) (bonus)

Slaughterhouse - Welcome to: Our House
 06. "Get Up"

T.I. - Trouble Man: Heavy is the Head 
 04. "Wild Side" (featuring ASAP Rocky)

Rihanna - Unapologetic 
 13. "No Love Allowed"

2013

Cocaine 80's - The Flower of Life
 01. "Kuro to Shiro"
 02. "The Distant River"
 03. "Ground"
 04. "The Sun and the Moon"
 05. "Fly Ass Pisces"
 06. "Higher Self"
 07. "Lucid"

Logic - Young Sinatra: Welcome to Forever 
 19. "Man of the Year"

Kanye West - Yeezus 
 02. "Black Skinhead" (add. production)
 10. "Bound 2" (add. production)

Jay-Z - Magna Carta... Holy Grail 
 01. "Holy Grail" (featuring Justin Timberlake) (add. production)

Big Sean - Hall of Fame 
03. "10 2 10" (produced with Travis Scott and Key Wayne)
07. "First Chain" (featuring Nas and Kid Cudi)
11. "Sierra Leone" (produced with James Poyser)
13. "World Ablaze" (featuring James Fauntleroy II)
15. "All Figured Out"
17. "Switch Up" (featuring Common, produced with DJ Mano and Rob Kinelski)
Leftover
 "Control" (featuring Kendrick Lamar and Jay Electronica)

Pusha T - My Name Is My Name 
11. "Pain" (featuring Future, co-produced with Kanye West)

Jhené Aiko - Sail Out
07. "Comfort Inn Ending (Freestyle)"

2014

Vince Staples - Shyne Coldchain Vol. 2
02. "Locked & Loaded"
03. "Humble"
04. "45"
08. "Turn"
09. "Shots"
10. "Earth Science"

Common - Nobody's Smiling
01. "The Neighborhood" (featuring Lil Herb & Cocaine 80s)
02. "No Fear"
03. "Diamonds" (featuring Big Sean)
04. "Blak Majik" (featuring Jhené Aiko)
05. "Speak My Piece"
06. "Hustle Harder" (featuring Snoh Aalegra & Dreezy)
07. "Nobody’s Smiling"
08. "Real" (featuring Elijah Blake)
09. "Kingdom" (featuring Vince Staples)
10. "Rewind That"
11. "Out On Bond" (featuring Vince Staples)
12. "7 Deadly Sins"
13. "Young Hearts Run Free" (featuring Cocaine 80s)
Leftover
 00. "War" 
 00. "Made In Black America" (featuring Ab-Soul)

Jhené Aiko - Souled Out
03. "To Love & Die" (featuring Cocaine 80s)
04. "Spotless Mind" 
00. "It's Cool"
09. "Brave" 
11. "Promises" (featuring Miyagi and Namiko)
12. "Pretty Bird (Freestyle)" (featuring Common)
14. "Blue Dream" 
16. "Beautiful Ruin"

Vince Staples - Hell Can Wait
04. "Hands Up"

2015

Vince Staples - Summertime '06
 Disc 1
 01. "Ramona Park Legend, Pt. 1"  
 02. "Lift Me Up"  
 05. "Loca" 
 06. "Lemme Know" (featuring Jhené Aiko and DJ Dahi)
 07. "Dopeman" (featuring Joey Fatts and Kilo Kish)
 08. "Jump off the Roof" (featuring Snoh Aalegra)
 Disc 2
 01. "Ramona Park Legend Pt. 2"  
 02. "3230"  
 04. "Might Be Wrong" (featuring Haneef Talib)
 05. "Get Paid" (featuring Desi Mo)
 06. "Street Punks"  
 07. "Hang N' Bang" (featuring A$ton Matthews)
 08. "C.N.B."  
 09. "Like It Is"  
 10. "'06"

2016

Rihanna - Anti
 12. "Higher"

Vince Staples - Prima Donna
 06. "Pimp Hand"

Tassho Pearce - G.O.O.D. Company
02. "Satellites" (featuring Kid Cudi)

2017

Logic - Everybody
 06. "America" (featuring Black Thought, Chuck D, Big Lenbo & No I.D., produced with 6ix & Logic)

Vic Mensa - The Manuscript
 01. "Almost There" (featuring Mr. Hudson)
 03. "Rollin' Like a Stoner" (produced with Larrance Dopson, Mike Dean & Da Internz)

JAY-Z - 4:44
 01. "Kill Jay Z"
 02. "The Story of O.J."
 03. "Smile" (featuring Gloria Carter)
 04. "Caught Their Eyes" (featuring Frank Ocean)
 05. "4:44"
 06. "Family Feud" (featuring Beyoncé)
 07. "Bam" (featuring Damian Marley)
 08. "Moonlight"
 09. "Marcy Me"
 10. "Legacy"
 11. "Adnis" (additional production)
 12. "Blue's Freestyle / We Family"
 13. "MaNyfaCedGod" (featuring James Blake) (additional production)

Vic Mensa - The Autobiography 
 01. "Didn't I (Say I Didn't)" (produced with Smoko Ono, Papi Beatz, Vic Mensa & Carter Lang)
 02. "Memories on 47th St." (produced with 1500 or Nothin' & DJ Dahi)
 04. "Homewrecker" (featuring Weezer) (produced with Vic Mensa)
 05. "Gorgeous" (featuring Syd) (produced with 1500 or Nothin')
 06. "Heaven on Earth" (featuring The-Dream) (produced with Smoko Ono, Papi Beatz & Vic Mensa)
 08. "Down for Some Ignorance (Ghetto Lullaby)" (featuring Chief Keef & Joey Purp) (produced with Mike Dean & Vic Mensa)
 09. "Coffee & Cigarettes" (produced with Papi Beatz & Om'Mas Keith)
 12. "The Fire Next Time"

2018

Drake - Scorpion
Side A
 01. "Survival" (produced with Noah "40" Shebib)
 02. "Nonstop" (additional production)
 04. "Emotionless" (produced with Noah "40" Shebib & The 25th Hour)
Side B
 02. "Summer Games" (additional production)

2019

Nas - The Lost Tapes 2
 16. "Beautiful Life" (featuring Raheem DeVaughn)

Snoh Aalegra - Ugh, Those Feels Again
 01. "Here Now (Intro)" (Produced with Maneesh & Snoh Aalegra)
 07. "Love Like That" (Produced with Johan Lenox)
 09. "Charleville 9200, Pt. II" (Produced with Steve Wyreman)
 12. "Nothing to Me" (Produced with Maneesh)
 13. "I Didn't Mean to Fall in Love" (Produced with Maneesh)

2020

Jay Electronica - A Written Testimony
 08. "Fruits of the Spirit"

Logic - No Pressure 
 03. "GP4" (Produced with 6ix)
 04. "Celebration" (Produced with Logic)
 12. "A2Z" (Produced with Bidaye)
 15. "Obediently Yours"

2021

Snoh Aalegra - Temporary Highs in the Violet Skies
 01. "Indecisive" (Produced with Johan Lenox)
 02. "Lost You" (Produced with Maneesh)
 06. "We Don't Have to Talk About It" (Produced with Doctor O)
 12. "Taste" (Produced with Terrace Martin)

John Mayer - Sob Rock
 03. "New Light" (Produced with John Mayer)

2022

Brent Faiyaz - Wasteland 
 02. "Loose Change" (Produced with Brent Faiyaz, Jordan Ware, Paperboy Fabe and Raphael Saadiq)
 15. "Role Model" (Produced with Brent Faiyaz, Jordan Ware and Paperboy Fabe)

Beyoncé - Renaissance 
 07. "Church Girl" (Produced with Beyoncé, The-Dream and Stuart White)

Upcoming

Keithian - Bayou Boy 
 00. "I'm Open"

References

External links
 
 
 

Production discographies
Hip hop discographies
Discographies of American artists